Gorerotted were an English deathgrind band formed in 1997 that disbanded in January 2008 and reformed with new members as The Rotted. Gorerotted's lyrics and song titles were largely inspired by horror films and serial killers. The band's song titles often incorporated humorous rhymes or puns such as "Cut, Gut, Beaten, Eaten", "Put Your Bits in a Concrete Mix", and "Only Tools and Corpses", a pun on the popular British sitcom Only Fools and Horses, the latter beginning with a similar introductory drumbeat to the sitcom's theme music.

Musically, Gorerotted employed a distinctive dual vocal style. Originally with Ben McCrow delivering a deep, death growl-style, and Mr. Gore (Jason Merle) providing contrast to this with a high-pitched yelling and screaming. When Wilson joined as the band's bass player on the album Only Tools and Corpses he also added to the vocals by delivering high-pitched growls and additional screams, thus the band had three different voices going at times. After Mr. Gore's departure in 2004, Wilson took over his vocal parts in the older songs. The guitar riffs are often fast and technical, with the bass usually doubling these parts. Both the guitars and the bass are tuned down one whole-step (guitars are tuned to D), to achieve a heavier sound. The drumming is extremely fast, often making use of blast beats and double bass.

During their time together, the band toured the UK and Europe extensively with acts such as Nile, Decapitated, Cryptopsy, Vomitory and Pungent Stench, visited the US to play at Maryland Deathfest in 2007, and appeared in an advert for The Sun newspaper, as well as on the soundtrack to two films, namely The Incredibly Strange People Show and Porn of the Dead, a zombie-themed hardcore pornography release.

Ben Goreskin and Tim Carley renamed the band The Rotted in 2008 when their new material took on more of a death metal/punk vibe and continued to tour and record until splitting in 2014. Ben now co-fronts grindcore/hardcore punk/crust punk pioneers Extreme Noise Terror.

Discography 
Her Gash I Did Slash (Demo, 1998)
Mutilated in Minutes (Relapse Records/Dead Again/IBD, 2001)
Split Your Guts Vol. 1 (Deepsend Records, 2002)
Only Tools and Corpses (Metal Blade Records, 2003)
A New Dawn for the Dead (Metal Blade Records, 2005)

Members 
Final line-up
Tim Carley – guitar (1997–2014)
Ben McCrow – vocals (1999–2014)
Nate Gould – drums (2008–2014)
Reverend Trudgill – bass (2008–2014)

Former members
Jeremy Gray – guitar (1997–1999)
Jason Merle – vocals (1997–2003)
Dave Hirschheimer – drums (1998)
Steve Smith – bass (1998–2001)
David 'Dicksplash'  Hewitt – guitar (1999–2001)
Matt Hoban – guitar (2001–2007)
Jonathon Rushforth – drums (1999–2008)
Phil Wilson – bass, vocals (2001–2008)
Gianpiero Piras – guitar (2007–2009)

Touring musicians
Dan Ford – drums (1997)
Lakis Kyriacou – guitar (1997)
Dan Knight – guitar (2006)

External links 
Official history website

English death metal musical groups
Musical groups established in 1997
Musical groups disestablished in 2008